Akershus Amtstidende, "Amta", is a local newspaper published in Drøbak, Norway. It covers the western Follo district, with its stronghold in Frogn and Nesodden.

History and profile
It was established in 1874 under the name Follo Tidende, and got its current name in 1884.

Akershus Amtstidende is published by the company Akershus Amtstidende AS, which is in turn owned 100% by Amedia. Its editor is Jan Mattias Mellquist. A hundred years later, it had a circulation of 5,655, and had the same editor-in-chief as Akershus Arbeiderblad and Romerikes Blad.

References

External links
  Official website

1874 establishments in Norway
Publications established in 1874
Daily newspapers published in Norway
Norwegian-language newspapers
Mass media in Akershus